Emmanuel Degland (14 May 1900 – 19 May 1969) was a French javelin thrower. He competed at the 1924 and 1928 Summer Olympics and finished in 21st and 24th place, respectively.

References

External links
 

1900 births
1969 deaths
French male javelin throwers
Olympic athletes of France
Athletes (track and field) at the 1924 Summer Olympics
Athletes (track and field) at the 1928 Summer Olympics
Sportspeople from Ille-et-Vilaine